Monica Niculescu was the defending champion, but lost in the first round to Pauline Parmentier.

Carina Witthöft won her first WTA title, defeating Monica Puig in the final, 6–3, 7–5.

Seeds

Draw

Finals

Top half

Bottom half

Qualifying

Seeds

Qualifiers

Lucky losers
  Naomi Broady

Draw

First qualifier

Second qualifier

Third qualifier

Fourth qualifier

References 
 Main draw
 Qualifying draw

BGL Luxembourg Open - Singles
Luxembourg Open
2017 in Luxembourgian tennis